Dombarovsky (also given as Dombarovskiy and Tagilom) is a military airbase  northwest of the village of Dombarovsky, near Yasny in Russia's Orenburg Oblast. Operated by the Soviet Air Forces and later by the Russian Air Force, it hosted fighter interceptor squadrons and hosts an ICBM base (which has been adapted for commercial satellite launches) with a supporting helicopter base.

The site is divided into three sites:
 The former main runway and dispersals: 
 The current ICBM base: 
 The current ICBM support helicopter base:  home to the 84th Independent Helicopter Squadron of the 13th Red Banner Rocket Division

Interceptor base
The facility featured three revetment compounds.

The 412th Fighter Aviation Regiment (412 IAP) flew from the base with Sukhoi Su-9 (Fishpot) aircraft in the early 1970s.  The regiment replaced it in 1978 with the Mikoyan-Gurevich MiG-23M (Flogger-B).  The 412 IAP disbanded in 1993.

Other reporting of the 763rd Fighter Aviation Regiment (763 IAP) flying MiG-23 aircraft in 1991 appears to be incorrect. The 763rd Fighter Aviation Regiment was, it appears from more recent data, flying from Yugorsk-2.

ICBM base
Dombarovsky is also the home of the 13th Dombarovsky Red Banner Division, 31st Missile Army of the Strategic Rocket Forces. The base was built during the mid-60s along with the majority of the Soviet ICBM bases.

The first base commander was Major-General Dmitri Chaplygin. Up to 10 units of Strategic Rocket Forces were based in the area, each with anywhere from 6 to 10 operational silos. At the peak of operations, Dombarovsky maintained a total of 64 silos on full alert. By 2002, according to the Russian press, the number had dropped to 52. The missiles deployed in the region were primarily the RS-20 type and its sub-variants.

On December 22, 2004, the Rocket Forces conducted from the base a test launch of an R-36M2 to the Kamchatka Peninsula.

Commercial launches
With the conversion of the R-36M ICBM for use as a satellite launch vehicle, the Dnepr system, Dombarovsky has launched a number of commercial payloads.  These civilian launches are operated by the Russian Air Force on behalf of the launcher's operator, Russian/Ukrainian consortium Kosmotras.  Kosmotras calls the facility Yasny launch base, and has constructed additional facilities necessary for commercial satellite launch operations, including clean room integration facilities.

References

Soviet Air Force bases
Soviet Air Defence Force bases
Cities and towns in Orenburg Oblast
Spaceports
Soviet and Russian space program locations
Strategic Rocket Forces